Jean-Pierre Laflaquière (born 18 August 1947 in Toulouse, France) is a retired French senior civil servant. His last office was High Commissioner of the Republic in French Polynesia from 3 September 2012 to 23 August 2013. His successor was Lionel Beffre. He was Prefect without assignment from 2011 to 2012.

Laflaquière previously served as the Prefect of Guyane (French Guiana) from 2006 to 2009.

Honours and decorations

National honours

Ministerial honours

Civilian medals

References

1947 births
High Commissioners of the Republic in French Polynesia
Prefects of French Guiana
French civil servants
Living people
Officiers of the Légion d'honneur
Knights of the Ordre national du Mérite
Chevaliers of the Ordre des Palmes Académiques
Knights of the Order of Agricultural Merit